Eddie Blazonczyk, Sr. (July 12, 1941 – May 21, 2012) was a Grammy award-winning polka musician and founder of the band The Versatones.  He was inducted into the International Polka Hall of Fame in 1970, and was a 1998 National Heritage Fellowship recipient. He has been called "one of the most important figures in the creation of the contemporary Polish-American polka sound." He released more than 60 albums.

History
Eddie Blazonczyk was born in Chicago, Illinois to Polish immigrant parents of Goral heritage.

Before becoming a polka artist, and founding Chicago-based Bel-Aire Records in 1963, Eddie Blazonczyk recorded under the name Eddy Bell for Mercury Records, Versa Records, and Lucky Four Records, all three labels based in Chicago. During this period Blazonczyk toured with Buddy Holly, Gene Vincent and Brenda Lee. The records he made for these labels were rockabilly sides, and novelty songs.  "The Great Great Pumpkin", released on Lucky Four #1012, is probably the most noteworthy of these recordings.  This recording is still occasionally heard around Halloween and is highly sought by record collectors.  Lenny LaCour, the owner of Lucky Four Records, encouraged Blazonczyk, at the age of 22, to specialize in polka music, rather than to continue as a rockabilly singer. Blazonczyk has said, "I took his advice, and never regretted it."

He is credited with inventing the rhythmic polka subgenre known as "Chicago push," although ironically the name given to the style comes from bands who came after and were inspired by Blazonczyk, notably the Chicago Push. Musicologist Norm Cohen wrote that "in his illustrious career, Blazonczyk and his Versatones were the primary ambassadors of Polish-American polka, touring constantly and playing well over 200 road gigs per year."

The Versatones played a mix of both traditional and original tunes, with Blazonczyk singing in both Polish and English. The band consisted of a fiddler and concertina player, two trumpeter/clarinetists, a drummer and Blazonczyk himself on vocals and electric bass. Though his focus remained on the polka genre, Blazonczyk was a fan of rock, country, bluegrass and Cajun music and liked to incorporate those styles into his music when he felt it was appropriate.

Blazonczyk retired from performing in 2002.  At that time, he turned over responsibility for his band, The Versatones, to his son, Eddie Blazonczyk Jr.  The Versatones played their last performance on New Year's Eve, 2011.

Death
Blazonczyk died of multiple organ dysfunction syndrome on May 21, 2012.

Awards and honors
Blazonczyk was nominated for 11 Grammy Awards, and his album Another Polka Celebration won the 1986 Grammy for Best Polka Recording. He was a recipient of the 1998 National Heritage Fellowship awarded by the National Endowment for the Arts, which is the highest honor in the folk and traditional arts in the United States.

Discography

Live and Kickin'  2001
Another Day At The Office 2000
Smokin' Polkas	 	1999 	
Shakin' not Stirred	 	1998	
Holiday Favorites 	 1997	
Greatest Hits-Vol 2 	 	1997 	
Music, Music, Music	 	1996	
Polkatime-20 Of The Greatest Hits	 	1996	
Better Than Ever 	 	1995	
Always, Forever And A Day	 1994 	
A New Batch Of Polkas  	1993 	
All American Polkas 	 1992 	
All Around The World	 1991	
Everybody Polka 	 1990 	
Good Ol' Days  1989	
25th Anniversary Album	 1988	
Let's Celebrate Again	 1987 	
Another Polka Celebration 1985    (1986 Grammy Winner)	
Polka Fireworks	 1984	
Polka Thriller 	 1983	
Custom Made Polkas	 1982	
Polka Medley Album	 1982	
Polka Music's Here To Stay 	 1981 	
Polka Festival 	 1981	
Hawaiian Polka Tour 	 1980	
Polka Cruise 	 1980	
More Honky Style Polkas Vol 3	 1979 	
Roaring Polkas	 1978	
Wide World Of Polkas 	 1977	
Award Winning Polkas	 	1977	
Polka Jamboree	 	1976	
We Were Made For Each Other	 	1976	
Polka Spotlite 	 1976	
A Polka Christmas	 1975	
Polka Concert 	 1975	
More Honky Style Polkas Vol 2 	 1974	
More Country Flavored Polkas Vol 2	 	1974 	
Polka Hits	 1973	
Langer Sisters Meet Eddie Blazonczyk's Versatones 	 	1972 	
Country Flavored Polkas	 1972 	
Honkey Style Polkas 	 1971	
Polka Music Hall Of Fame 	 1971	
Something A Little Bit Different 	 1970	
America's Most  Wanted Polka Band	 1969	
Polkas A Plenty	 1969	
Poland European Tour 1968	
Let's Hear A Polka	 1967	
Polish Party 	 1967	
Christmas Time 	 1966	
Happy Polka Music 	 1966	
Po Staro Krajsku- Old Country Style Vol 2 	 1966 	
Polka Tour 	 1965	
Musically Yours 	 1965	
Po Staro Krajsku- Old Country Style	 1964	
Something New Just For You 	 1964	
Here Come The Versatones	 1963	
Polka Parade 	 1963

References

External links
Eddie Blazonczyk's Versatones
Polka Association Honors

Polka musicians
American people of Polish descent
Grammy Award winners
Musicians from Chicago
1941 births
2012 deaths
National Heritage Fellowship winners